Pieve del Grappa is a comune in the province of Treviso, Veneto region of Italy. It was formed on 30 January 2019 with the merger of the comunes of Crespano del Grappa and Paderno del Grappa.

Sources

Cities and towns in Veneto